Falling out or Falling Out may refer to:

 Falling-out, a culture-bound syndrome
 A deterioration in the quality of a friendship, usually due to a specific cause

Music
 "Falling Out" (song), song on the 2000 album White Pepper by Ween
 Falling Out (Peter Bjorn and John album), 2004 album by Peter Bjorn and John
 Falling Out (Serena Ryder album), 1999 album by Serena Ryder
 "Falling Out", song on the 2003 album Two Lefts Don't Make a Right...but Three Do by Relient K

See also
 
 
 Falling Down (disambiguation)
 Fallout (disambiguation)